Ganpati Ramanath is an American engineer, currently John Tod Horton Professor of Materials Science and Engineering at Rensselaer Polytechnic Institute and an Elected Fellow of the American Physical Society.

References

Year of birth missing (living people)
Living people
Fellows of the American Physical Society
21st-century American engineers
University of Illinois alumni